What Were Once Vices Are Now Habits is the fourth studio album by American rock band the Doobie Brothers. The album was released on February 1, 1974, by Warner Bros. Records.

Recording and content
Tom Johnston's "Another Park, Another Sunday" was the album's first single. "It's about losing a girl," stated Johnston. "I wrote the chords and played it on acoustic, and then Ted [Templeman] had some ideas for it, like running the acoustic guitar through a Leslie." The song did moderately well on the charts, peaking at No. 32. Record World said that it was "more melodic and easy-tempoed [than previous Doobie Brothers' hits], in tune with the pastoral weekend setting."

The second single released was "Eyes of Silver", another Johnston-penned tune. According to him, "Wordwise, that one really isn't that spectacular. I wrote them at the last minute."  Cash Box said that it was "very similar to their smash 'Listen To The Music and "features every lick the Doobies have featured in their great patented sound".  Record World said that the group was "back into their chuggin' folk-rock groove, fitting more easily into their 'Listen to the Music' bag". That song did not have much success on the charts either, peaking at only No. 52. 

Grasping for chart action, Warner Brothers re-released the band's first single, "Nobody", backed with Tiran Porter's instrumental "Flying Cloud". This release was soon overshadowed when radio stations discovered "Black Water". Other stations joined in and the song was officially released as a single that went on to sell over a million copies and became the Doobie Brothers' first No. 1 hit. "Black Water" had been featured as the B-side of "Another Park, Another Sunday" eight months earlier.

Artwork
The unusual lettering on the album cover was suggested by drummer John Hartman after visiting his high school alma mater, J.E.B. Stuart in Falls Church, Virginia. The school's newspaper, Raiders Digest, had just changed its masthead to include those stylized fonts.  The cover photo is by Dan Fong, their touring Media Coordinator. The cover photo was taken at a concert on December 4, 1973, at E.A. Diddle Arena, Western Kentucky University, Bowling Green, Kentucky. He also did the cover photo for their album Takin' It to the Streets.

Track listing

Personnel
The Doobie Brothers
Tom Johnston – acoustic and electric guitars, lead and backing vocals
Patrick Simmons – acoustic and electric guitars, lead and backing vocals
Tiran Porter – bass, backing vocals
John Hartman – drums, percussion
Michael Hossack – drums
Keith Knudsen – drums , backing vocals

Additional musicians
Jeff "Skunk" Baxter – pedal steel guitar on "Tell Me What You Want"
Bill Payne – organ on "Song to See You Through" and "Eyes of Silver", piano on "Pursuit on 53rd St.", clavinet on "You Just Can't Stop It"
James Booker – piano on "Down in the Track"
Arlo Guthrie – autoharp on "Tell Me What You Want"
Eddie Guzman – congas on "Road Angel", "You Just Can't Stop It" and "Daughters of the Sea", timbales on "Daughters of the Sea", and various other percussion instruments
Milt Holland – tabla on "Tell Me What You Want", vibraphone on "Black Water", "Tell Me What You Want" and "Another Park, Another Sunday", marimba and pandeiro on "Daughters of the Sea", and various other percussion instruments
The Memphis Horns - horns on "Song to See You Through", "Eyes of Silver" and "You Just Can't Stop It"
Wayne Jackson – trumpet
Andrew Love – tenor saxophone
James Mitchell – baritone saxophone
Jack Hale – trombone
Novi Novog – viola on "Spirit" and "Black Water"
Ted Templeman – additional percussion
uncredited – synthesizer on "Flying Cloud"

Production
Producer: Ted Templeman
Production Coordination: Benita Brazier, The Doobie Brothers
Engineer: Donn Landee, Lee Herschberg
Mastering: Lee Herschberg
Horn Arrangements: Andrew Love and Wayne Jackson with the Memphis Horns
Cover Design and Art Direction: Chas Barbour
Photography: Dan Fong

Charts

Certifications

References

Notes

1974 albums
The Doobie Brothers albums
Albums produced by Ted Templeman
Warner Records albums
Albums recorded at Wally Heider Studios